Paul Tevis is an Ennie-award-winning podcaster whose shows Have Games, Will Travel and The Voice of the Revolution discuss games, game design, and gamer subculture.  He is an active participant in this subculture, and is a recognizable figure at many of its conventions.   He has released his own game, A Penny for My Thoughts, in the summer of 2009 through Evil Hat Productions.

Tevis began his career in gaming as a "Man in Black" for Steve Jackson Games, demoing games from their catalog at conventions.  He has also worked for Atlas Games in a similar capacity.

Have Games, Will Travel
Tevis' original podcast, Have Games, Will Travel ran for more than one hundred episodes since the first in July 2005.  A typical show featured Tevis' reviews of a handful of games.  Some episodes were themed, exclusively discussing wargaming, reviewing all the new games premiered at a recent convention, or the like.  Have Games, Will Travel was also known for its convention recaps which offer an overview by Tevis of his experiences at conventions.  Many of these featured interviews with prominent designers or authors also attending.

Have Games, Will Travel won an Ennie for Best Podcast of 2007, the first year that the category existed.  Tevis was often cited as an inspiration for other beginning podcasters, and his reviews reached and advised a not-insignificant audience of gamers.

In Episode 111, released on June 23, 2008, Tevis announced that he would no longer be releasing full-length episodes of Have Games, Will Travel, though he would still be releasing the shorter For a Few Games More segments.  His final episode of Have Games, Will Travel: For A Few Games More was episode 50, released January 1, 2010.

A Fistful of Games
Tevis maintains a "companion" blog to Have Games, Will Travel, where he presents his session overviews of various games.  This blog can be considered his repository of data, while Have Games, Will Travel is his findings and commentary.

The Voice of the Revolution
In October 2006, Tevis began a new podcast with Brennan Taylor of Indie Press Revolution.  The Voice runs concurrently with Have Games, Will Travel, and is a house organ of IPR.  The podcast presents updates on new products available and features reviews, interviews, and game design advice.  Paul stopped co-hosting Voice of the Revolution with episode 36 in October 2009.

Chair of the Academy of Adventure Gaming Arts and Design
In October 2009, Tevis was appointed the new Chair of the Academy of Adventure Gaming Arts and Design (AAGAD), which administers the Origins Awards on behalf of the Game Manufacturer's Association (GAMA).  He cited this appointment and other reasons for discontinuing his podcasts.

References

External links
 Have Games, Will Travel
 The Voice of the Revolution
 Indie Press Revolution

American podcasters
Indie role-playing game designers
Living people
Role-playing game designers
Year of birth missing (living people)